White Serbia, called also Boiki, is the name applied to the assumed homeland of the White Serbs, a tribal subgroup of Wends, a mixed and the westernmost group of Early Slavs. They are the ancestors of the modern Serbs and Sorbs. Boiki is mentioned in De Administrando Imperio, a 10th-century work by Byzantine Emperor Constantine VII (r. 913–959). According to it, the "White Serbs" lived on the "other side of Turkey" (i.e. Hungary), in the area that they called "Boiki" (Bohemia). The area adjacent to it was Francia as well as White Croatia, from where the White Croats trace their origin.

Location

Sources
Constantine VII in De Administrando Imperio recounts in Chapter 32, "It should be known that the Serbs are descended from the unbaptized Serbs, also called ‘white’, who live beyond Hungary, in a region called by them Boïki, where their neighbor is Francia, as is also Megali Croatia, the unbaptized, also called ‘white’. In this place, then, these Serbs also dwelt from the beginning... Now, after the two brothers succeeded their father in the rule of Serbia, one of them, taking one half of the folk, came as the refugee to Heraclius, the emperor of the Romaioi gave them a region in the Thessalonica... Then, after some time these same Serbs decided to depart to their own homes, and the emperor sent them off. And so, when they had crossed the Danube River, they changed their minds and sent a request to the Emperor Heraclius... the emperor settled these same Serbs in these countries".

In the 33rd chapter he says, "(It should be known) that the clan of the anthypatos and patrikios Michael, son of Visevitz, archon of the Zachlumians, came from the unbaptized inhabitants on the Visla River, called Litziki, and they settled on the river called Zachluma".

A Latin document from the early 10th century said that the "Hungarians moved to Pannonia from Serbia (Ungarorum gens a Servia egressa in Pannoniam)". Tibor Živković suggest that this likely refers to Boïki (Bohemia).

Dispute
Theories on the location of the so-called "Boiki" and "White" Serbs have been disputed, but it is generally established to have been around the region of Bohemia and Saxony. Since the 19th century, two most prominent theories were of Bohemia, and the land of the Boykos in Eastern Galicia in the Carpathians. The latter was mostly argued by 19th-century scholars, like Pavel Jozef Šafárik (1795–1865) and Henry Hoyle Howorth (1842–1923), who also included the White Serbs among the Polabian Slavs. Rather than relating Boiki and Bohemia, which in turn derived from ethnonym of the Celtic tribe Boii, they related the toponym to the much younger ethnonym of the Rusyns sub-ethnic group Boykos. Béni Kállay (1839–1903) noted that many historians assumed that Serbian territory was identical to the Czech lands (Bohemia) based on DAI's account and the name Bojka, but he also supported Šafárik's thesis. Other scholars who had a similar opinion were Vladimir Ćorović (1885–1941), and Ljubivoje Cerović (b. 1936). However, most scholars like Borivoje Drobnjaković (1890–1961), Andreas Stratos (1905–1981), Sima Ćirković (1929–2009), and Relja Novaković (1911–2003) located them to the West in the area between the Elbe and Saale rivers, roughly between Bohemia and East Germany (Polabia). According to Mykhailo Hrushevsky (1898), Gerard Labuda (1949), Gyula Moravcsik (1949), Jaroslav Rudnyckyj (1962–1972) and Henryk Łowmiański (1964) unlike Croats, there is no proof that Serbs ever lived within Bohemia or in Eastern Galicia, only that they lived near Bohemia, and the connection between Boiki and Boykos is considered to be scholarly outdated and rejected.

According to archaeologist V. V. Sedov (1995), the 32nd chapter of De Administrando Imperio indicates that it was located in the Lower Lusatia territory where the Sorbs were located, but the 33rd chapter about Zachlumia caused confusion which resulted with several hypotheses. The first group of scholars argued the homeland existed between rivers Elbe and Saale, the second in the upper course of rivers Vistula and Oder, and the third from Elbe and Saale to the upper course of Vistula. However, Sedov concluded that the archaeological data does not confirm any of these hypotheses, and most plausible is the consideration by Lubor Niederle that there's no evidence that White Serbia ever existed and Constantine VII most probably made up Northern Great Serbia only according to the analogy with Great Croatia, which by other historians also did not exist. According to Tibor Živković, the structure and content of the subchapter about the family of Michael of Zahumlje indicates that this account was likely told by Michael himself. He is not noted as being of Serbian origin. Živković thought Michael's family may have preserved the memory of their tribal origin.

Toponyms and antroponyms
Tadeusz Lewicki in his toponomastic research of Polish lands found many toponyms documented between 12th and 14th century with a root "Serb-" and "Sarb-" and defined them as both a trace and remnant population of the so-called White Serbs in DAI. Since the 13th and 15th centuries were recorded also personal names and surnames which possibly derive from the ethnonym. However, according to Hanna Popowska-Taborska, the method didn't take into account the unambiguous etymological interpretation of the Serbian ethnonym because of which most probably the majority of the toponyms don't derive from the ethnonym itself. Also, both Łowmiański and Popowska-Taborska found them and their abundance unusual which cannot reflect the early medieval great migration of the Slavs, and it rather describes the Sorbian population living on the Polish territory which was brought there from the Elbe river as captives by the Piast dynasty.

Gallery

See also
List of Medieval Slavic tribes

References

Sources

Further reading

Migration Period
History of the Serbs